Jake Higginbottom (born 15 October 1993) is an Australian professional golfer.

In 2012, Higginbottom won Australia's second-oldest amateur golf tournament, the Riversdale Cup. 

On 25 November 2012, Higginbottom became the first amateur in more than half a century to win the BMW New Zealand Open. He turned professional two days later.

Amateur wins
2010 New South Wales Amateur, China Amateur Open
2011 Queensland Amateur, Keperra Bowl, Handa Junior Masters
2012 Riversdale Cup

Professional wins (1)

PGA Tour of Australasia wins (1)

Team appearances
Amateur
Nomura Cup (representing Australia): 2011 (winners)
Bonallack Trophy (representing Asia/Pacific): 2012
Sloan Morpeth Trophy (representing Australia): 2012
Australian Men's Interstate Teams Matches (representing New South Wales): 2010, 2011, 2012 (winners)

References

External links

Australian male golfers
PGA Tour of Australasia golfers
Asian Tour golfers
Sportspeople from Newcastle, New South Wales
Sportsmen from New South Wales
1993 births
Living people